William Hawthorne Wirskye is a prominent Texas prosecutor who is currently the First Assistant District Attorney in the Collin County District Attorney's Office in Collin County, Texas. Wirskye is best known for being the lead prosecutor who tried the Kaufman County DA murders, which ultimately resulted in the death penalty for the defendant, former Justice of the Peace of Kaufman County, Eric Williams. Before that, he was a Dallas County prosecutor for 12 years.

Early life and education
Wirskye graduated from Southern Methodist University Law School in 1993, and has a bachelor's degree from the University of Texas at Dallas.

Career
Wirskye assisted prosecutor Toby Shook in prosecuting the Texas Seven. The death penalty was secured against all of the surviving members of the infamous prison group. In 2013, Wirskye was the lead prosecutor on the capital murder case against the Kaufman County DA murderer, Eric Williams. In 2020, Wirskye was the lead prosecutor on the capital murder case against Brandon McCall, who killed Richardson Police Officer David Sherrard.

Prior to joining the Collin County DA's Office, Wirskye was the first assistant in Dallas County under embattled District Attorney Susan Hawk.

References

Living people
Year of birth missing (living people)
Texas lawyers
People from McKinney, Texas
Southern Methodist University alumni
University of Texas at Dallas alumni
American prosecutors
Place of birth missing (living people)